MySQL Manager is an application that is included in the Mac OS X Server that starts and stops the MySQL Database service that is within the server. Unlike other server tools, this tool is only installed on the server itself.

External links
 https://www.apple.com/server/macosx/

MacOS Server